Same-sex marriage has been legal in Tabasco since 27 October 2022. A bill to legalise same-sex marriage was passed by the Congress of Tabasco on 19 October 2022. It was signed by Governor Carlos Manuel Merino Campos, and published in the official state journal on 26 October, taking effect the next day. Tabasco was the fourth-to-last state in Mexico to legalize same-sex marriage.

Legal history

Background

The Mexican Supreme Court ruled on 12 June 2015 that state bans on same-sex marriage are unconstitutional nationwide. The court's ruling is considered a "jurisprudential thesis" and did not invalidate state laws, meaning that same-sex couples denied the right to marry would still have to seek individual amparos in court. The ruling standardized the procedures for judges and courts throughout Mexico to approve all applications for same-sex marriages and made the approval mandatory. Specifically, the court ruled that bans on same-sex marriage violate Articles 1 and 4 of the Constitution of Mexico. Article 1 of the Constitution states that "any form of discrimination, based on ethnic or national origin, gender, age, disabilities, social status, medical conditions, religion, opinions, sexual orientation, marital status, or any other form, which violates the human dignity or seeks to annul or diminish the rights and freedoms of the people, is prohibited.", and Article 4 relates to matrimonial equality, stating that "man and woman are equal under the law. The law shall protect the organization and development of the family."

On 18 February 2015, a local newspaper announced that the first same-sex marriage had occurred in Villahermosa on 13 February after a legal appeal to the Supreme Court. By May 2017, ten same-sex couples had married in Tabasco via the recurso de amparo remedy.

Legislative action
Debate surrounding the legalization of same-sex marriage or civil unions emerged in Tabasco in 2009, simultaneously with the discussion then-ongoing in Mexico City. Following the passage of legislation legalizing same-sex marriage in Mexico City in December 2009, debate gained traction in Tabasco. In 2009, a group of 20 same-sex couples sent a motion to the Congress of Tabasco asking that they be allowed to marry. The state's largest political parties, the Institutional Revolutionary Party (PRI) and the Party of the Democratic Revolution (PRD), announced their support for same-sex marriage in 2010. Despite the support of these political parties, there was little legislative will to change the law. As a result, an initiative to reform article 154 of the Civil Code to legalize same-sex marriage was presented by the LGBT organization  (Tudyssex) in April 2014, but it stalled and was not voted on.

The Party of the Democratic Revolution submitted another same-sex marriage bill on 3 July 2015, following a ruling from the Supreme Court that same-sex marriage bans are unconstitutional nationwide. On 18 May 2016, a lawmaker said that there was consensus in Congress to approve the bill submitted by the PRD, but eventually no vote happened. The July 2018 elections resulted in the National Regeneration Movement (MORENA), a party that supports same-sex marriage, winning the majority of legislative seats in Congress and the governorship. In November 2021, the president of Tudyssex, José Cruz Guzmán, criticised the inaction of the state Congress. MORENA had been reportedly reluctant to pass same-sex marriage legislation due to opposition from conservative groups. In April 2022, activists said they were working with MORENA deputies to introduce a bill to legalize same-sex marriage.

Passage of legislation in 2022
A same-sex marriage bill was introduced to Congress on 12 October 2022 by Deputy José de Jesús Hernández Díaz (MORENA). It was approved by a Congress committee on 17 October with 4 votes in favour and 2 abstentions, and a final vote was scheduled for Wednesday, 19 October. Congress passed the bill on 19 October by 23 votes to 5 with seven abstentions. Deputy Emilio Antonio Contreras Martínez de Escobar, a supporter of the legislation, said that "[i]t is necessary that, as representatives of society, we listen and represent society through this type of legislative actions". Opponents of the legislation organised prayer rallies outside the Congress building. The law was signed by Governor Carlos Manuel Merino Campos, and published in the official state journal on 26 October, taking effect the next day.

Article 154 of the Civil Code was amended to read:
 in Spanish: 
 (Marriage is the free union of two people, who are over eighteen years of age, regardless of gender, to form a community of life, where both partners seek respect, equality and mutual aid.)

Public opinion
According to a 2018 survey by the National Institute of Statistics and Geography, 56.5% of the Tabasco public opposed same-sex marriage, the second highest in Mexico after the neighboring state of Chiapas at 59%.

See also
Same-sex marriage in Mexico
LGBT rights in Mexico

Notes

References

External links
 Text of Tabasco's same-sex marriage law (in Spanish)

Tabasco
Tabasco
2022 in LGBT history